The 2006 Mid-Eastern Athletic Conference men's basketball tournament took place on March 7–11, 2006, at the RBC Center in Raleigh, North Carolina.  defeated , 60–56 in the championship game, to capture its third MEAC Tournament title. The Pirates earned an automatic bid to the 2005 NCAA tournament as No. 16 seed in the Minneapolis region. In the play-in round they fell to fellow No. 16 seed  71–49.

Format
All eleven conference members participated, with the top 5 teams receiving a bye to the quarterfinal round. After seeds 6 through 11 completed games in the first round, teams were re-seeded. The lowest remaining seed was slotted against the top seed, next lowest remaining faced the #2 seed, and third lowest remaining seed squared off against the #3 seed.

Bracket

References

MEAC men's basketball tournament
2005–06 Mid-Eastern Athletic Conference men's basketball season
MEAC men's basketball tournament